Leslie Anderson Stephes (born March 30, 1982 in Guantánamo) is a first baseman/outfielder who is currently a free agent.

Career
Anderson previously played for the Cuban national baseball team and Camagüey of the Cuban National Series. He was part of Cuba's roster at the 2006 and 2009 World Baseball Classics.

Anderson, who is primarily a center fielder, hit .363 during the 2005-06 season.  Anderson defected from Cuba and signed a four-year contract worth $1.7 million with the Tampa Bay Rays prior to the 2010 season. Released by the Rays after the 2013 season, Anderson signed with the Yomiuri Giants. He finished the 2014 NPB season with a batting average of .319, along with 15 home runs and 50 RBIs.

On 2 December 2016 it was confirmed that Anderson had been released by the Giants.

On May 6, 2017, Anderson signed with the Bravos de León of the Mexican Baseball League. He was released on May 29, 2017.

In 2020, Anderson became the second Cuban player after Erisbel Arruebarrena to come back to the Serie Nacional after defecting and playing for a Major League organization when he signed for the Toros de Camagüey.

See also

List of baseball players who defected from Cuba

References

External links

NPB stats

1982 births
2006 World Baseball Classic players
2009 World Baseball Classic players
Bravos de León players
Charlotte Stone Crabs players
Defecting Cuban baseball players
Durham Bulls players
Living people
Montgomery Biscuits players
Nippon Professional Baseball outfielders
Sportspeople from Guantánamo
Yomiuri Giants players